The Seguin Gazette is a newspaper based in Seguin, Texas, covering the Guadalupe County area of Central Texas. It publishes five days a week (excluding Monday and Saturday). It is owned by Southern Newspapers Inc.

The Seguin Enterprise began publication in 1888 and the Guadalupe Gazette-Bulletin traces its origins to 1890. The Gazette-Bulletin changed its name to the Seguin Gazette in 1952. In 1979, publisher John C. Taylor of the Gazette and Enterprise publisher Otha L. Grisham agreed to a merger, but in effect, Taylor and the Gazette soon took over the operations and Grisham retired. The new combined daily newspaper was called Seguin Gazette-Enterprise.

Southern Newspapers bought the paper in 1984. In 1999, it moved from afternoon to morning publication. The newspaper changed its name to the Seguin Gazette in 2011.

References

About Us, seguingazette.com
Seguin Gazette-Enterprise, Texas Press Association
Seguin celebrates 125th birthday, Seguin Enterprise

Daily newspapers published in Texas
Guadalupe County, Texas
Publications established in 1888
Seguin, Texas
1888 establishments in Texas